Land of the Free II is the ninth full-length studio album by Gamma Ray. It was released on 16 November 2007 in Germany, 19 November in Europe, 21 November in Japan and January 15, 2008 for North America. To promote Land of the Free II, Gamma Ray joined Helloween on the 2007/08 Hellish Rock Tour. The song "Into the Storm" is available on the band's MySpace page and its music video on YouTube.

The first-edition CD, released as a Digipak, was limited to 30,000 copies.

Track listing

Japanese Import Track listing

Japanese Bonus Track

Personnel 
 Kai Hansen - Vocals, guitars
 Henjo Richter - Guitars, keyboards
 Dirk Schlächter - Bass
 Dan Zimmermann - Drums

Technical personnel 
 Produced and engineered by: Dirk Schlächter, Kai Hansen
 Mixed by: Tommy Newton at Area 51 Studio, Celle, Germany
 Cover Painting by: Hervé Monjeaud
 Booklet Graphics and Layout by: Dirk Illing

Charts 

2007 albums
Gamma Ray (band) albums
SPV/Steamhammer albums
Sequel albums
Albums produced by Kai Hansen